Veltheim (historically known as Veltheim an der Ohe) is a municipality in the district of Wolfenbüttel, in Lower Saxony, Germany.

Veltheim family 
The noble Brunswick ministerialis family von Veltheim was first mentioned in 1160. (See Veltheim family, German article.) They owned Veltheim Castle until 1495, however remained based on other estates that had since been acquired in the Helmstedt, Magdeburg and Harz regions. The von Veltheim family bought back Veltheim Castle in 1832 and they continue to inhabit it.

References

Wolfenbüttel (district)